Nora Al Matrooshi (نورا المطروشي — born in 1993 in the Emirate of Sharjah) is an Emirati engineer and astronaut. Selected in April 2021, she will train with the NASA Astronaut Group 23 of astronauts to work as an international mission specialist.

She is a mechanical engineer by training, with a BS from the United Arab Emirates University. She competed in the 2011 International Mathematical Olympiad in Amsterdam, Netherlands. She also studied in 2014 at the Vaasa University of Applied Sciences (VAMK) in Finland, and studied Korean at Hanyang University in Seoul, South Korea. Since 2016, she works as piping engineer at the UAE's National Petroleum Construction Company.

See also 

 Timeline of space travel by nationality
 UAE Space Agency

References

Further reading

 

Emirati astronauts
Women astronauts
Living people
1993 births
United Arab Emirates University alumni
Hanyang University alumni